Mount Humbug is a summit in Silver Bow County, Montana, in the United States.

References

Humbug
Humbug